Rhadinorhynchidae is a family of parasitic worms from the order Echinorhynchida.

Species
Rhadinorhynchidae has 4 subfamilies (Golvanacanthinae, Gorgorhynchinae, Rhadinorhynchinae, and Serrasentoidinae) and the following species:

Golvanacanthinae Paggi and Orecchia, 1972
Golvanacanthus Paggi and Orecchia, 1972
Golvanacanthus blennii Paggi and Orecchia, 1972

Gorgorhynchinae Van Cleave & Lincicome, 1940
Australorhynchus Lebedev, 1967
Australorhynchus tetramorphacanthus Lebedev, 1967
Cleaveius Subrahmanian, 1927
Cleaveius circumspinifer Subrahmanian, 1927
Cleaveius clupei (Gupta & Sinha, 1992)
Cleaveius durdanae Kumar, 1992
Cleaveius fotedari (Gupta & Naqvi, 1980)
Cleaveius inglisi (Gupta & Fatma, 1987)
Cleaveius leiognathi Jain & Gupta, 1979
Cleaveius longirostris Moravec and Sey, 1989
Cleaveius mysti (Sahay and Sinha, 1971)
Cleaveius portblairensis Jain & Gupta, 1979
Cleaveius prashadi (Datta, 1940)
Cleaveius puriensis (Gupta & Sinha, 1992)
Cleaveius secundus (Tripathi, 1959)
Cleaveius singhai (Gupta & Fatma, 1987)
Cleaveius thapari (Gupta & Naqvi, 1980)
Edmondsacanthus Smales, 2009
Edmondsacanthus blairi Smales, 2009
Gorgorhynchus Chandler, 1934
Gorgorhynchus celebesensis (Yamaguti, 1954)
Gorgorhynchus clavatus Van Cleave, 1940
Gorgorhynchus lepidus Van Cleave, 1940
Gorgorhynchus medius (Linton, 1908) Chandler, 1934
Gorgorhynchus nemipteri Parukhin, 1973
Gorgorhynchus occultus Smales, Barton, and Chisholm

G. occultus has been found parasitising the Cobbler wobbegong (Sutorectus tentaculatus) in Bunbury, Western Australia. The proboscis of this worm has 18 to 20 rows of 8 or 9 hooks followed by a well-developed neck. The body contains irregular circles of small spines in a single anterior portion. The male reproductive system limited to the posterior quarter of the trunk. There are three cement glands.

Gorgorhynchus ophiocephali Furtado & Lau, 1971
Gorgorhynchus polymixiae Kovalenko, 1981
Gorgorhynchus robertdollfusi Golvan, 1956
Gorgorhynchus satoi Morisita, 1937
Gorgorhynchus tonkinensis Amin & Ha, 2011
Gorgorhynchus trachinotus Noronha, Vicente, Pinto & Fábio, 1986

Leptorhynchoides Kostylev, 1924

Leptorhynchoides acanthidion Steinauer & Nickol, 2015
Leptorhynchoides aphredoderi Buckner & Buckner, 1976
Leptorhynchoides apoglyphicus Steinauer & Nickol, 2015
Leptorhynchoides atlanteus Steinauer & Nickol, 2015
Leptorhynchoides macrorchis Steinauer & Nickol, 2015
Leptorhynchoides nebularosis Steinauer & Nickol, 2015
Leptorhynchoides plagicephalus (Westrum, 1821)
Leptorhynchoides polycristatus Amin, Heckmann, Halajian, El-Naggar & Tavakol, 2013
Leptorhynchoides seminolus Steinauer & Nickol, 2015
Leptorhynchoides thecatus (Linton, 1891) Kostylev, 1924

Metacanthocephaloides Yamaguti, 1959

Metacanthocephaloides zebrini Yamaguti, 1959

Metacanthocephalus Yamaguti, 1959
Metacanthocephalus campbelli (Leiper & Atkinson, 1914)
Metacanthocephalus dalmori Zdzitowiecki, 1983
Metacanthocephalus johnstoni Zdzitowiecki, 1983
Metacanthocephalus ovicephalus (Zhukov, 1963)
Metacanthocephalus pleuronichthydis Yamaguti, 1959
Metacanthocephalus rennicki (Leiper & Atkinson, 1914)

Micracanthorhynchina Strand, 1936

Micracanthorhynchina atherinomori Smales, 2014
Micracanthorhynchina chandrai Bhattacharya, 2007
Micracanthorhynchina cynoglossi Wang, 1980
Micracanthorhynchina dakusuiensis (Harada, 1938)
Micracanthorhynchina golvani Gupta & Sinha, 1992
Micracanthorhynchina hemiculturus Demshin, 1965
Micracanthorhynchina hemirhamphi (Baylis, 1944)
Micracanthorhynchina indica Farooqi, 1980
Micracanthorhynchina kuwaitensis Amin & Sey, 1996
Micracanthorhynchina lateolabracis Wang, 1980
Micracanthorhynchina motomurai (Harada, 1935)
Micracanthorhynchina segmentata (Yamaguti, 1959)

Paracanthorhynchus Edmonds, 1967

Paracanthorhynchus galaxiasus Edmonds, 1967	

Pseudauchen Yamaguti, 1963

Pseudauchen epinepheli (Yamaguti, 1939)

Pseudoleptorhynchoides Salgado-Maldonado, 1976

Pseudoleptorhynchoides lamothei Salgado-Maldonado, 1976

Rhadinorhynchinae Lühe, 1912

Cathayacanthus Golvan, 1969
 Cathayacanthus bagarii Moravec and Sey, 1989
Cathayacanthus exilis (Van Cleave, 1928)
Cathayacanthus spinitruncatus Amin, Heckmann & Ha, 2014
Megistacantha Golvan, 1960
 Megistacantha horridum (Lühe, 1912)
 Megistacantha sanghaensis Kvach, Jirků & Scholz, 2016
Paragorgorhynchus Golvan, 1957
 Paragorgorhynchus albertianus Golvan, 1957
 Paragorgorhynchus chariensis Troncy, 1970
Pseudogorgorhynchus Moravec, Wolter & Korting, 2000
Pseudogorgorhynchus arii Moravec, Wolter & Korting, 2000
Raorhynchus Tripathi, 1959
Raorhynchus cadenati Gupta & Sinha, 1992
Raorhynchus guptai Gupta & Kumar, 1987
Raorhynchus inexspectatus Golvan, 1969
Raorhynchus megalaspisi Wang, Wang and Wu, 1993	
Raorhynchus mayeri (Heinz, 1934)
Raorhynchus polynemi Tripathi, 1959
Raorhynchus schmidti George & Nadakal, 1978
Raorhynchus terebra Rudolphi, 1819
Raorhynchus thapari Gupta & Fatma, 1981
Rhadinorhynchus Lühe, 1911

Rhadinorhynchus africanus (Golvan, Houin and Deltour, 1963)
Rhadinorhynchus atheri (Farooqui, 1981)
Rhadinorhynchus bicircumspinis Hooper, 1983
Rhadinorhynchus biformis Smales, 2014
Rhadinorhynchus cadenati (Golvan & Houin, 1964)
Rhadinorhynchus camerounensis Golvan, 1969
Rhadinorhynchus capensis Bray, 1974
Rhadinorhynchus carangis Yamaguti, 1939
Rhadinorhynchus chongmingnensis Huang, Zheng, Deng, Fan and Ni, 1988
Rhadinorhynchus cololabis Laurs & McCauley, 1964
Rhadinorhynchus decapteri (Braicovich, Lanfranchi, Farber, Marvaldi, Luque and Timi, 2014) 

R. decapteri is a parasite of the marine fish Round scad (Decapterus punctatus) and is found coastal waters of Brazil. It has 10 longitudinal rows of 22–26 hooks. The species name decapteri was derived from the genus (Decapterus) of the type host.

Rhadinorhynchus ditrematus Yamaguti, 1939
Rhadinorhynchus dollfusi Gupta & Fatma, 1987
Rhadinorhynchus dorsoventrospinosus Amin, Heckmann & Há, 2011
Rhadinorhynchus dujardini Golvan, 1969
Rhadinorhynchus echeneisi Gupta and Gupta, 1980
Rhadinorhynchus erumeii (Gupta & Fatma, 1981)
Rhadinorhynchus ganapatii Chandra, Hanumantha-Rao & Shyamasundari, 1985
Rhadinorhynchus hiansi Soota & Bhattacharya, 1981
Rhadinorhynchus japonicus Fujita, 1920
Rhadinorhynchus johnstoni Golvan, 1969
Rhadinorhynchus keralensis Gupta & Fatma, 1987
Rhadinorhynchus laterospinosus Amin, Heckmann & Há, 2011
Rhadinorhynchus lintoni Cable & Linderoth, 1963
Rhadinorhynchus oligospinosus Amin & Heckmann, 2017

Rhadinorhynchus mariserpentis (Steinauer, Garcia-Vedrenne, Weinstein & Kuris, 2019)

R. mariserpentis parasitizes the Oarfish, Regalecus russelii and has been collected near Wakamatsu-ku, Kitakyūshū, Japan.

Rhadinorhynchus ornatus Van Cleave, 1918
Rhadinorhynchus pelamysi Gupta & Gupta, 1980
Rhadinorhynchus pichelinae Smales, 2014
Rhadinorhynchus plagioscionis Thatcher, 1980
Rhadinorhynchus plotosi Parukhin, 1985
Rhadinorhynchus polydactyli Smales, 2014
Rhadinorhynchus polynemi Gupta & Lata, 1967
Rhadinorhynchus pomatomi Smales, 2014
Rhadinorhynchus pristis (Rudolphi, 1802)
Rhadinorhynchus saltatrix Troncy & Vassiliades, 1973
Rhadinorhynchus selkirki Van Cleave, 1921
Rhadinorhynchus seriolae (Yamaguti, 1963)
Rhadinorhynchus stunkardii Gupta & Fatma, 1987

Rhadinorhynchus trachuri Harada, 1935

R. trachuri is one of the most widespread acanthocephalans infesting fish from the Eastern Pacific, Western Pacific, and Indian Oceans. On the South pacific coast of Vietnam, it was found infesting the Frigate tuna (Auxis thazard), and the Torpedo scad (Megalaspis cordyla).

Rhadinorhynchus trivandricus George & Nadkal, 1978
Rhadinorhynchus vancleavei Golvan, 1969
Rhadinorhynchus zhukovi Golvan, 1969

Slendrorhynchus Amin & Sey, 1996

Slendrorhynchus breviclaviproboscis Amin & Sey, 1996

Serrasentoidinae Parukhin, 1982
Serrasentoides Parukhin, 1971
Serrasentoides fistulariae Parukhin, 1971

Hosts
Rhadinorhynchidae species parasitize fish hosts.

Notes

References

 
Echinorhynchida
Acanthocephala families